Champdray is a commune in the Vosges department in Grand Est in northeastern France. It lies 23 km east of Épinal, the department capital.

See also
Communes of the Vosges department

References

Communes of Vosges (department)